Funtime is an amusement ride manufacturer based in Dölsach, Austria. The company manufactures rides such as the Sling Shot, Star Flyer, and Vomatron.

History

In 1998, Funtime was established in the suburb of Bundall on the Gold Coast, Australia. Shortly after, the company opened a small amusement park in Surfers Paradise, a nearby Gold Coast suburb. At the time, the amusement park was known as Adrenalin Park and featured the company's Sling Shot and Vomatron rides.

In 2010, Funtime threatened legal action against Dutch amusement ride manufacturer, Mondial, after that company unveiled the WindSeeker which bears similarities to Funtime's patented Star Flyer ride. Mondial responded to the threat by stating that "there is no merit to Funtime's claim". The matter did not progress.

Products

 The Bell – a ride similar to a Frisbee, except they are located inside a giant bell
 Chaos Pendle – riders are mounted on the ends of several arms and spun around in a propeller-like fashion
 Rocket – riders are harnessed into a rocket shaped car which is raised into the air and spun around a tower and on its own axis
 Sky Diver – an amusement ride similar to a Skycoaster where riders are winched to the top of a launch tower and then dropped towards the ground, swinging from a cable tether back and forth until brought to a rest
 Sling Shot – a reverse bungee ride where passengers are propelled over 100 metres at speeds in the region of 160 kilometres per hour. The machine does not utilise rubber ropes or bungee cords as in a slingshot, but is powered by a patented spring propulsion device incorporating up to 720 specially-designed springs. The SlingShot can be custom designed to cause minimal disruption to existing venues.
 Star Flyer – a variation of the traditional swing ride where riders are swung around the top of a tower
 Tornado – a ride that simulates a tornado by sending riders in a figure-eight motion
 Vomatron – a type of ride similar to the centrifuges used in astronaut training, except on a vertical axis
 Skyfall – currently the highest transportable drop tower in the world with a height of

Ride installations

Amusement park

Funtime operates a small amusement park in the centre of Surfers Paradise, aptly named Funtime. The park features installations of their Sling Shot and Vomatron rides. The park was previously known as Adrenalin Park and featured several other rides and attractions, including an Intamin Parachute Drop tower, a mini golf course and a bungee tower.

See also
 :Category:Amusement rides manufactured by Funtime
 Booster (Fabbri ride), an amusement ride similar to the Vomatron
 Speed (ride), another amusement ride similar to the Vomatron

References

External links

 
 

Amusement ride manufacturers
Manufacturing companies of Austria
Manufacturing companies established in 1998
Manufacturing companies based on the Gold Coast, Queensland
Economy of Tyrol (state)
Austrian companies established in 1998